John Fitzgerald Clarke (July 16, 1827 – April 19, 1887) was an Ontario physician and political figure. He represented Norfolk North in the Legislative Assembly of Ontario from 1871 to 1879.

He was born in Coventry, England in 1827, the son of a Congregational minister who was sent to Upper Canada as a missionary in 1837. He studied medicine at McGill College and settled in Vittoria. He moved to Simcoe in 1851. He served on the town council and was the coroner for Norfolk County from 1848 to 1870. Clarke was editor and owner of the Long Point Advocate. He was later named sheriff for Thunder Bay District and moved to Port Arthur (later part of the city of Thunder Bay), where he died in 1887.

His brother William Fletcher Clarke was a minister and journalist.

External links

Transcription from Illustrated Historical Atlas of Norfolk County (1877)

1827 births
1887 deaths
Canadian Methodists
English emigrants to pre-Confederation Ontario
Immigrants to Upper Canada
Ontario Liberal Party MPPs
People from Coventry
Canadian coroners